Flower's Curse is a 2014 Chinese romance horror thriller film directed by Li Kelong. It was released on December 12 in China.

Cast
Qi Zhi
Liao Weiwei
Luo Bin
Zhang Xinyan
Tian Yuqing
Yang Zitong
Zhang Mengtian

Box office
By December 12, 2014, the film had earned ¥0.77 million at the Chinese box office.

References

2010s romantic thriller films
2014 horror thriller films
2014 horror films
Chinese horror thriller films
Chinese romantic thriller films
2014 films